Dixyrazine, also known as dixypazin (oxalate), sold under the brand names Ansiolene, Esocalm, Esucos, Metronal, and Roscal, is a typical antipsychotic of the phenothiazine group described as a neuroleptic and antihistamine. It was first introduced in Germany in 1969. It is used as a neuroleptic, anxiolytic, and antihistamine in doses between 12.5 and 75 mg a day.

Synthesis

Sodamide alkylation of phenothiazine (1) with 1-bromo-3-chloro-2-methylpropane [6974-77-2] (2) gives 10-(3-Chloro-2-methylpropyl)phenothiazine, CID:12299119 (3). Completion of the sidechain by alkylation with 1-[2-(2-Hydroxyethoxy) Ethyl]Piperazine [13349-82-1] (4) and displacement of the halogen completes the synthesis of Dixyrazine (5).

References

Primary alcohols
Dopamine antagonists
Ethers
H1 receptor antagonists
Phenothiazines
Piperazines
Typical antipsychotics